Piku is a 2015 Indian comedy-drama film directed by Shoojit Sircar and produced by N.P. Singh, Ronnie Lahiri and Sneha Rajani. The film stars Deepika Padukone as the eponymous protagonist, alongside Amitabh Bachchan and Irrfan Khan. Moushumi Chatterjee and Jisshu Sengupta play supporting roles. It was written by Juhi Chaturvedi and the musical score was composed by Anupam Roy. Piku tells the story of a headstrong Bengali architect, who along with her hypochondriac father and a helpful businessman embark on a road trip from New Delhi to Kolkata.

The film garnered awards and nominations in several categories, with particular praise for its writing, music, and the performances of Padukone and Bachchan. As of June 2016, the film has won a minimum of 35 awards.

At the 63rd National Film Awards, Piku won Best Actor (Bachchan), Best Original Screenplay and Best Dialogues. At the 61st Filmfare Awards ceremony, Piku won five awards, including Best Film – Critics, Best Actress (Padukone), and Best Actor – Critics (Bachchan). The film also garnered nominations for Best Film and Best Director at the ceremony. In addition, Piku won four awards, including Best Actor and Best Actress for Bachchan and Padukone, respectively, at the 22nd Screen Awards ceremony. Among other wins, the film received three Indian Film Festival of Melbourne Awards, three International Indian Film Academy Awards, two Stardust Awards, and five awards each from the BIG Star Entertainment and Zee Cine award ceremonies.

Accolades

See also
 List of Bollywood films of 2015

Footnotes

References

External links
 Accolades for Piku at the Internet Movie Database

Lists of accolades by Indian film